Dewey Peak is a  summit located on the shared border of Mount Rainier National Park and William O. Douglas Wilderness. It is also on the shared border of Pierce County and Yakima County in Washington state. Dewey Peak is situated on the crest of the Cascade Range southeast of Chinook Pass, east of Seymour Peak, and northeast of Shriner Peak. Its nearest higher peak is Chinook Peak,  to the north. Dewey Peak is named in association with Dewey Lake which is set below its north aspect. Precipitation runoff from Dewey Peak drains into tributaries of the Cowlitz River and Yakima River.

Climate

Dewey Peak is located in the marine west coast climate zone of western North America. Most weather fronts originate in the Pacific Ocean, and travel northeast toward the Cascade Mountains. As fronts approach, they are forced upward by the peaks of the Cascade Range (Orographic lift), causing them to drop their moisture in the form of rain or snowfall onto the Cascades. As a result, the west side of the Cascades experiences high precipitation, especially during the winter months in the form of snowfall. During winter months, weather is usually cloudy, but, due to high pressure systems over the Pacific Ocean that intensify during summer months, there is often little or no cloud cover during the summer. Because of maritime influence, snow tends to be wet and heavy, resulting in high avalanche danger.

References

Gallery

External links
 National Park Service web site: Mount Rainier National Park
 National Forest Service web site: William O Douglas Wilderness

Cascade Range
Mountains of Pierce County, Washington
Mountains of Washington (state)
Mountains of Yakima County, Washington
North American 2000 m summits